Víctor Alfonso Rossel Del Mar (born 5 November 1985) is a Peruvian footballer. Besides Peru, he has played in Venezuela.

References

External links
 
 

1985 births
Living people
Footballers from Lima
Association football forwards
Peruvian footballers
Sport Boys footballers
Club Universitario de Deportes footballers
Coronel Bolognesi footballers
Cienciano footballers
José Gálvez FBC footballers
Esporte Clube Pelotas players
Club Deportivo Universidad César Vallejo footballers
Real Garcilaso footballers
Unión Comercio footballers
Sport Huancayo footballers
Universidad Técnica de Cajamarca footballers
Peruvian Primera División players
Peruvian expatriate footballers
Expatriate footballers in Brazil